Peter Edwin Wright is a scientist, an NMR spectroscopist and a professor at the Scripps Research Institute. He serves as editor-in-chief of the Journal of Molecular Biology.

Education and early life
Wright is from New Zealand and studied at the University of Auckland. He graduated in 1968 with a Bachelor of Science degree followed by a Master of Science degree in 1969. He completed his PhD in chemistry in 1972 with a thesis on the physico-chemical properties of metal ion sites in cuproproteins: an investigation of selected copper(II) complexes.

Career and research
From 1976 to 1984, he was employed by the University of Sydney. Since 1984, he has been employed at the Scripps Research Institute.

Wright is a proponent of the theory of conformational sampling being of importance to enzyme catalysis and intrinsically disordered proteins, which is opposed to the theory of electrostatic preorganization.

Personal life
Wright is married to Jane Dyson.

References

Living people
Scripps Research faculty
University of Auckland alumni
Members of the United States National Academy of Sciences
Year of birth missing (living people)